Royalton Hartland School District is a school district in Middleport, New York, United States and serves the nearby hamlet of Gasport. The superintendent is Henry Stopinski. The district operates three schools: Royalton-Hartland High School, Royalton-Hartland Middle School, and Royalton-Hartland Elementary School.

Administration
The district offices are located at 54 State Street. The current superintendent is Henry Stopinski.

Selected former superintendents 
William Bassett
Gary Brader–1988-1992 (unknown, named Superintendent of Cheektowaga-Maryvale Union Free School District))
Larry Shanley–1992-1993 (Assistant Superintendent - Royalton-Hartland Central School District, retired))
Peter Kachris [interim]–1993-1994
Judith P. Staples–1994-1997 (Assistant Superintendent - Depew Union Free School District, named Superintendent of Barker Central School District)
Paul J. Bona–1997-2009 (Superintendent - Elizabethtown Lewis Central School District, retired)
Kevin M. MacDonald–2009-2013 (Assistant Superintendent - Orleans/Niagara BOCES, named Superintendent of Genesee Valley Educational Partnership)
Roger Klatt–2013-2018 (Superintendent - Barker Central School District, retired)

Royalton-Hartland High School

Royalton Hartland High School is located at 54 State Street and serves grades 9 through 12. The current principal isGary Bell.

History
Until 2005, Royalton Hartland High School housed grades 7-12 and was known as Royalton-Hartland Junior/Senior High School. In 2005, the school district was reconsolidated, and the High School was reconfigured to house solely grades 9-12.

Selected former principals
Previous assignment and previous assignment denoted in parentheses
Edward Sanderson
John H. George
Thomas Abraham–?-1993 (unknown, named Superintendent of Hartford Central Schools)
Robert Farkas [interim]–1993-1994
James Christmann–1994-1995 (Principal - Pine Hill Middle School, named Principal of Pioneer High School)
Dennis A. Priore–1995-1998 (unknown, named Principal of Cleveland Hill Middle School)
Kevin MacDonald–1998-2001 (Assistant Principal - Lewiston-Porter High School, named Director of Alternative Education at Erie 1 BOCES)
Gary McNunn [interim]–2001-2002
Kevin L. Shanley–2002-2009 (Principal - Gasport Elementary School, named Superintendent of Cuba-Rushford Central School District)
Michael J. Murray–2009-2011 (Principal - Mount Morris Elementary School, named Director of Athletics of Mount Morris Central School District)

Royalton Hartland Middle School

Royalton Hartland Middle School (formerly Middleport Elementary School) is located at 78 State Street in Middleport and serves grades 5 through 8. The current principal is Danielle Alterio.

History
Until 2005, Royalton Hartland Middle School housed grades K-6 and was known as Middleport Elementary School. The school was reconfigured in 2005, and began housing grades 5-8.

Royalton-Hartland Elementary School

Royalton Hartland Elementary School is located at 4500 Orchard Place in Gasport and serves grades K through 4. The current principal is Donna VanSlyke.

History
Royalton Hartland Elementary was known as Gasport Elementary School and housed Grades K-6 until 2005. The school was reconfigured to house Grades K-4 and became the district's sole elementary school in 2005.

References

External links
Official site

Education in Niagara County, New York
School districts in New York (state)